New Plymouth Central is the central business district and central suburb of New Plymouth, in the Taranaki region of the western North Island of New Zealand.

Demographics

New Plymouth Central had a population of 1,110 at the 2018 New Zealand census, a decrease of 42 people (−3.6%) since the 2013 census, and a decrease of 42 people (−3.6%) since the 2006 census. There were 525 households, comprising 573 males and 534 females, giving a sex ratio of 1.07 males per female. The median age was 43.9 years (compared with 37.4 years nationally), with 138 people (12.4%) aged under 15 years, 204 (18.4%) aged 15 to 29, 558 (50.3%) aged 30 to 64, and 207 (18.6%) aged 65 or older.

Ethnicities were 76.5% European/Pākehā, 15.9% Māori, 0.5% Pacific peoples, 14.6% Asian, and 3.8% other ethnicities. People may identify with more than one ethnicity.

The percentage of people born overseas was 25.9, compared with 27.1% nationally.

Although some people chose not to answer the census's question about religious affiliation, 49.7% had no religion, 33.5% were Christian, 0.8% had Māori religious beliefs, 3.2% were Hindu, 1.4% were Muslim, 1.6% were Buddhist and 3.8% had other religions.

Of those at least 15 years old, 213 (21.9%) people had a bachelor's or higher degree, and 168 (17.3%) people had no formal qualifications. The median income was $31,900, compared with $31,800 nationally. 153 people (15.7%) earned over $70,000 compared to 17.2% nationally. The employment status of those at least 15 was that 483 (49.7%) people were employed full-time, 135 (13.9%) were part-time, and 39 (4.0%) were unemployed.

Economy

Retail

Centre City shopping centre opened in New Plymouth Central in 1988. It covers an area of 4,530 m², with 125 shops including Farmers. It has 700 carparks.

References

Suburbs of New Plymouth
Central business districts in New Zealand